Shanghai Tianma Circuit is a permanent racing circuit located at the junction of A30 motorway and Shenzhuan Road, in Sheshan, Songjiang District, Shanghai, People's Republic of China. Inaugurated in 2004, the circuit is part of a resort which includes a 10,000 metre square proving ground, a 4X4 course, media center and grandstand, a cinema showing motoring-related films, a multifunctional hall, VIP rooms, a clubhouse that provide Chinese and western meals, a gym, a mini-supermarket and a shop for motor racing supplies.

The circuit

There are 4 turn with the width of 14 meters.

It holds a round of China Superbike Championship (CSBK). On September 30, 2011 was announced that the Chinese round of the 2011 WTCC would be hosted by the Tianma Circuit.

Lap records

The official fastest race lap records at the Shanghai Tianma Circuit are listed as:

Notes

References

External links
Superbike Race at the Tianma Circuit
Tianma Circuit Website 
Drag racing at the Tianma Circuit

FIA Grade 4 circuit
Sports venues in Shanghai
Motorsport venues in Shanghai
World Touring Car Championship circuits